Jang Ji-hun (Hangul: 장지훈) (born January 6, 1998 in Gimhae, South Gyeongsang) is a South Korean pitcher for the SSG Landers in the Korea Baseball Organization.

References 

SSG Landers players
KBO League pitchers
South Korean baseball players
1998 births
Living people
People from Gimhae
Sportspeople from South Gyeongsang Province